Sir Moses Israel Finley, FBA (born Finkelstein; 20 May 1912 – 23 June 1986) was an American-born British academic and classical scholar. His prosecution by the United States Senate Subcommittee on Internal Security during the 1950s, resulted in his relocation to England, where he became an English classical scholar and eventually master of Darwin College, Cambridge. His most notable publication is The Ancient Economy (1973) in which he argued that the economy in antiquity was governed by status and civic ideology, rather than rational economic motivations.

Early life
Finley was born in 1912 in New York City to Nathan Finkelstein and Anna Katzenellenbogen. About 1946, he adopted the surname Finley.

He was educated at Syracuse University, where, aged fifteen, he graduated magna cum laude in psychology, and at Columbia University. Although his M.A. was in public law, most of his published work concerned ancient history, especially the social and economic aspects of the classical world.

Career

United States
Finley taught at Columbia University and City College of New York, where he was influenced by members of the Frankfurt School who were working in exile in America. He then taught at Rutgers University.

Red scare
On 5 September 1951, an ex-communist, Karl Wittfogel, testified before the House Un-American Activities Committee that Finley was a communist. On 28 March 1952, Finley appeared before the Committee and invoked the Fifth Amendment regarding his association with communism. On 7 September 1952, Lewis Webster Jones, the president of Rutgers University, announced his intention to appoint Trustee and Faculty Committees to review the cases of professors involved in government inquiries. On 15 November 1952, FBI Director J. Edgar Hoover met with Jones to discuss the cases. On 12 December 1952, Rutger's Board of Trustees resolution declared, "It shall be cause for immediate dismissal of any member of faculty or staff" to fail to co-operate with government inquiries. On 31 December 1952, Rutgers dismissed Finley. Rutgers University records show: 
On 3 December 1952, the Special Faculty Committee issued a report stating there should be no charges against Heimlich or Finley and that the University should take no further action in the matter. However, the Trustees, who had the final say in the matter, issued a resolution on 12 December 1952: "it shall be cause for immediate dismissal of any member of faculty or staff" who invokes the Fifth Amendment before an investigatory body in refusing to answer questions relating to communist affiliations and that Professors Heimlich and Finley would be dismissed as of December of 31, 1952 unless they conformed to the new policy. Neither chose to do so. There was protest at the decision by members of the faculty, who formed an Emergency Committee on the matter.

In 1954, he appeared before the United States Senate Subcommittee on Internal Security, which asked him whether he had ever been a member of the Communist Party USA. He again invoked the Fifth Amendment and refused to answer.

Britain
Finley immigrated to Britain, where he was appointed university lecturer in classics at Cambridge (1955–1964) and, during 1957, elected to a fellowship at Jesus College. He was reader of ancient social and economic history (1964–1970), professor of ancient history (1970–1979) and master of Darwin College (1976–1982). He gave the 1974 Mortimer Wheeler Archaeological Lecture.

He broadened the scope of classical studies from philology to culture, economics, and society. He became a British subject in 1962, and a Fellow of the British Academy in 1971, and was knighted by Queen Elizabeth II during 1979. He was a doctorate adviser to Paul Millett, now a senior lecturer in Classics at the University of Cambridge.

Work
Among his works, The World of Odysseus (1954, revised ed. with additional essays 1978) proved seminal. In it, he applied the findings of ethnologists and anthropologists like Marcel Mauss to interpret Homer, a radical method that was thought by his publishers to require a reassuring introduction by an established classicist, Maurice Bowra. Paul Cartledge asserted in 1995, "... in retrospect Finley's work can be seen as the seed of the present flowering of anthropologically-related studies of ancient Greek culture and society".

Following the example of Karl Polanyi, Finley argued that the ancient economy should not be analysed using the concepts of modern economic science, because ancient man had no notion of the economy as a separate part of society, and because economic actions in antiquity were determined not primarily by economic, but by social concerns. This text was later criticized by, amongst others, Kevin Greene,
who argues that Finley underplays the importance of technological innovation, and C. R. Whittaker,
who rejects the concept of a "consumer city".

Marriage and death 
In 1932 Finley married Mary (who later changed to her mother's surname, Thiers), a schoolteacher, and the two enjoyed a happy and mutually reinforcing marriage. On the day of her death he suffered a cerebral haemorrhage, and he died the following day on 23 June 1986 at Addenbrooke's Hospital, Cambridge. The New York Times obituary adds: "He had suffered a stroke the previous day, an hour after learning of the death of his wife."

Bibliography
 Studies in Land and Credit in Ancient Athens, 500–200 B.C.: The Horos Inscriptions (1951).
 Economy and Society in Ancient Greece (1953).
 The World of Odysseus (1954).
 Aspects of Antiquity: Discoveries and Controversies (1960).
 The Ancient Greeks: An Introduction to Their Life and Thought (1963).
 A History of Sicily: Ancient Sicily to the Arab Conquest (1968).
 Aspects of Antiquity: Discoveries and Controversies (1968).
 Early Greece: The Bronze and Archaic Ages (1970).
 The Ancient Economy (1973).
 Democracy Ancient and Modern (1973).
 Studies in Ancient Society, editor (1974).
 The Use and Abuse of History (1975).
 Schliemann's Troy: One Hundred Years After (1975).
 Studies in Roman Property, editor (1976).
 The Olympic Games: The First Thousand Years, with H.W. Pleket (1976).
 Ancient Slavery and Modern Ideology (1980; expanded edition edited by Brent D. Shaw, 1998).
 The Legacy of Greece: A New Appraisal (1981).
 Authority and Legitimacy in the Classical City-State (1982).
 Politics in the Ancient World (1983).
 Ancient History: Evidence and Models (1985).
 A History of Sicily, with Denis Mack Smith & Christopher Duggan (1986; abridged from the 1968 edition).

Finley was also the editor of numerous volumes of essays on ancient history.

See also

 Morris U. Cohen
 Jack D. Foner
 Morris Schappes
 Rapp-Coudert Committee

Notes

Further reading
 Derks, Hans. "The Ancient Economy: The Problem and the Fraud," The European Legacy, Vol. 7, No. 5. (2002), pp. 597–620.
 Hornblower, Simon. "A gift from whom?: [Moses Finley's book The World of Odysseus: Critical Essay]," Times Literary Supplement, 24 December 2004, pp. 18–19.
 Morris, Ian. "Foreword [to the updated edition]," The Ancient Economy by Moses I. Finley. Berkeley; Los Angeles; London: University of California Press, 1999 (paperback), pp. ix–xxxvi.
 Nafissi, Mohammad. "Class, embeddedness, and the modernity of ancient Athens," Comparative Studies in Society and History, Vol. 46, Issue 2. (2004), pp. 378–410.
 Nafissi, Mohammad. Ancient Athens and Modern Ideology: Value, Theory and Evidence in Historical Sciences. Max Weber, Karl Polanyi and Moses Finley (Bulletin of the Institute of Classical Studies. Supplement; 80). London: Institute of Classical Studies, School of Advanced Study, University of London, 2005 (paperback).
 Shaw, Brent D.; Saller, Richard P. Editors' introduction to Economy and society in ancient Greece (with Finley's up-to-date bibliography). London: Chatto & Windus, 1981 (hardcover); N.Y.: The Viking Press, 1982 (hardcover); London: Penguin Books, 1983 (paperback).
 Silver, Morris. Review of The Ancient Economy, edited by Walter Scheidel and Sitta von Reden", Economic History Services, 3 January 2003.
 Watson, George. "The man from Syracuse: Moses Finley (1912–1986)," Sewanee Review, Vol. 112, Issue 1. (2004), pp. 131–137.

External links

 

 Lancaster University Photo of Moses Finley

1912 births
1986 deaths
20th-century American historians
American classical scholars
American emigrants to the United Kingdom
American male non-fiction writers
City University of New York faculty
Classical scholars of Columbia University
Classical scholars of Rutgers University
Columbia University faculty
Columbia University alumni
English Jews
English classical scholars
English historians
Fellows of Darwin College, Cambridge
Fellows of Jesus College, Cambridge
Fellows of the British Academy
Professors of Ancient History (Cambridge)
Jewish American historians
Knights Bachelor
Masters of Darwin College, Cambridge
Members of the University of Cambridge faculty of classics
Naturalised citizens of the United Kingdom
Syracuse University alumni
Victims of McCarthyism
English Jewish writers
20th-century American male writers
20th-century American Jews
Presidents of the Classical Association